The 2019 Coupe de Calédonie (also known as New Caledonia Cup) was the 64th edition of the national cup in New Caledonian football. AS Magenta were the defending champions. 

Hienghène Sport won the title, beating AS Lössi in the final, and earned the right to represent New Caledonia in the 2019–20 Coupe de France, entering at the seventh round.

Teams
Sixteen teams compete for the cup, being the ten teams of the 2019 New Caledonia Super Ligue and six teams which qualified from provincial competitions (two each from Loyalty Islands Province, North Province and South Province).

Round of 16
Games in the round of 16 took place on 14 September 2019.

Quarter-finals
Games in the quarter-finals took place on 21 September 2019.

Semi-finals
Games in the semi-finals were played on 28 September 2019, back-to-back at Stade Numa-Daly Magenta.

Final
The final was played on 19 October 2019 at Stade Numa-Daly Magenta.

References

External links
Coupe de Calédonie , Fédération Calédonienne de Football

Football competitions in New Caledonia
New Caledonia
2019 in New Caledonian football